Gicumbi is a district (akarere) in Northern Province, Rwanda. Its capital is Byumba, which is also the provincial capital.

Geography 
The district lies due-north of Kigali, straddling the major road from Kigali to Kampala. It is a hilly district.

Sectors 
Gicumbi district is divided into 21 sectors (imirenge): Bukure, Bwisige, Byumba, Cyumba, Giti, Kaniga, Manyagiro, Miyove, Kageyo, Mukarange, Muko, Mutete, Nyamiyaga, Nyankenke II, Rubaya, Rukomo, Rushaki, Rutare, Ruvune, Rwamiko and Shangasha.

Gihembe refugee camp 
Gihembe is camp of Congolese refugees located in Gicumbi District and is home to 12,904 residents.

On 15 December 2014, Gihembe Refugee Camp in Gicumbi District received a visit from Howard G. Buffett, who pledged funding to assist with repatriation of Congolese refugees.

Climate
The Köppen climate classification subtype for this climate is subtropical highland climate or Cfb.

See also
Mulindi - Mulindi Tea Plantation, National Liberation Struggle Museum

References 

 
 Inzego.doc — Province, District and Sector information from MINALOC, the Rwanda ministry of local government.

External links
 Official website

Districts of Rwanda